Glenfield is a hamlet in the town of Martinsburg, Lewis County, New York, United States. Glenfield has a post office with ZIP code 13343, which opened on March 3, 1855.

References

Hamlets in Lewis County, New York
Hamlets in New York (state)